Georgina Venetia Long  is Co-Medical Director of Melanoma Institute Australia (MIA), and Chair of Melanoma Medical Oncology and Translational Research at MIA and Royal North Shore Hospital, The University of Sydney.

Long is the first woman and the first Australian to be President of the Society for Melanoma Research. She has authored over 300 publications in melanoma clinical and translational research, including the New England Journal of Medicine and The Lancet, and has presented at hundreds of international conferences.

Early life and career 

Long grew up in a family of six children, with parents working in academia and medicine, and her early life involved living in Europe and the United States.

Long has conducted research on many clinical trials in melanoma, including adjuvant and metastatic melanoma. Long has also researched immuno-oncology, which she says is the ‘penicillin moment’ which will be able to turn cancer into ‘treatable conditions’. She has focussed on immuno-oncology in melanoma and targeted therapies. She also developed and is in charge of the treat-excise-analyse-melanoma (TEAM) program, which works on mechanisms of drug sensitivity and resistance.

Awards, honours and recognition 

‘Hardly a week goes by without a melanoma patient or their family expressing their gratitude for Professor Long’s ground-breaking research and clinical trials which have afforded them or their loved ones valuable extra time, and in many cases, a new chance at life. 'She is a true role model for all young Australians, particularly young women, who may be working towards a career in science and medicine,’ he said. Two babies have been named after the Melanoma Institute and Long.

 2021 — Outstanding Female Researcher Medal, inaugural winner, Australian Academy of Health and Medical Sciences.
2020 — Clarivate Highly Cited Researchers List 
2020 — Officer of the Order of Australia (AO) for "distinguished service to medicine, particularly to melanoma clinical and translational research, and to professional medical societies".
2019  — Clarivate Highly Cited Researchers List 
2019 — AFR 100 women of influence.
 2018 — GSK Award for Research Excellence.
 2018 — Clarivate Highly Cited Researchers List.
 2018 — New South Wales Cancer Institute Premier's Awards for Outstanding Cancer Research.
 2018 — Outstanding Cancer Researcher of the Year.
 2017 — Fellow of the Australian Academy of Health and Medical Sciences.
 2016 — Sir Zelman Cowen Universities Fund Prize for Discovery in Medical Research.
 2016 — Society for Melanoma Research, Young Investigator Award.
 2015 — INSTYLE award for Women in Science and Technology.
 2014 — Wildfire Award for the most highly-cited original peer-reviewed article published in 2011.
 2013 — Outstanding Cancer Research Fellow.

References 

Living people
Year of birth missing (living people)
Australian women scientists
Australian women academics
Academic staff of the University of Sydney
Australian oncologists
Women oncologists
Fellows of the Australian Academy of Health and Medical Sciences
Officers of the Order of Australia